Liu Baocheng (born February 1, 1917, date of death unknown) was a Chinese basketball player who competed in the 1936 Summer Olympics.

He was part of the Chinese basketball team, which was eliminated in the second round of the Olympic tournament. He played one match.

External links

1917 births
Year of death missing
Chinese men's basketball players
Olympic basketball players of China
Basketball players at the 1936 Summer Olympics
Place of birth missing
Republic of China men's national basketball team players